Ekenäs Archipelago National Park is situated in the Ekenäs archipelago, in the Uusimaa region of Finland. The park is maintained by Metsähallitus (Ministry of Forestry).

Most of the park's area is composed of rock islets near the open sea, and the water areas surrounding them. Landing on and using motorboats near the most important bird islands is forbidden from April 1 to July 17, to protect the nesting of aquatic birds.

The park can only be accessed by boat. Visitors without a boat can reach it by a water taxi.

Ekenäs Archipelago National Park received the European Diploma of Protected Areas on June 19, 1996. It is valid until June 2011.

See also 
 List of national parks of Finland
 Protected areas of Finland

References

External links
 Outdoors.fi – Ekenäs Archipelago National Park

Raseborg
Protected areas established in 1989
Geography of Uusimaa
Tourist attractions in Uusimaa
Ramsar sites in Finland
National parks of Finland